GZ Media, named for the Czech Gramofonové Závody, which translates to Gramophone Record Factory, employs nearly 2,000 people, and runs its major operations in Loděnice in the Czech Republic. GZ Media is known as the world's largest vinyl manufacturer. Since its founding in 1951, it has supplied records across the Eastern Bloc. 

Winslow Partners, a U.S. Private Equity Fund, briefly acquired GZ Media in 1998, only to sell it a few years later. Current GZ Media owner and president Zdenek Pelc is the longest reigning CEO in the history of the Czech Republic. 

Supported by American investments, GZ Media has developed into a modern business enterprise, accounting for approximately 60% of total vinyl records produced globally. According to The Guardian, GZ Media was valued at £76 million ($100 million) in 2016 and was forecast to press just over 25 million records a year. In 2015 it produced about 65,000 records per day.

References

External links

Mass media companies of the Czech Republic
Manufacturing companies established in 1948
1948 establishments in Czechoslovakia